James Rea Benson (January 21, 1807 – March 18, 1885) was an Ontario businessman and political figure. He represented Lincoln in the 1st Canadian Parliament as a Liberal-Conservative member until March 14, 1868, when he was named to the Senate of Canada for St. Catharines.

He was born in Ireland in 1807 and came to Kingston in Upper Canada with his family in 1819. He later moved to St. Catharines, where he was a hardware merchant, also operating mills and ships in partnership with Thomas Rodman Merritt. Benson was president of the Niagara District Bank, the Welland Loan Company and the St. Catharines Gas Company. He served on the town council for St. Catharines and on the council for Lincoln County. He died in 1885 in Ottawa while still in office.

The city of St. Catharines purchased his residence and used it for some time as the city hall.

Benson married the daughter of Charles Ingersoll. His daughter Helen married Calvin Brown, the first mayor of St. Catharines. His niece, Mary Benson, the daughter of his brother Thomas, married Thomas Rodman Merritt.

References 

1807 births
1885 deaths
Canadian senators from Ontario
Conservative Party of Canada (1867–1942) MPs
Conservative Party of Canada (1867–1942) senators
Irish emigrants to pre-Confederation Ontario
Members of the House of Commons of Canada from Ontario
St. Catharines city councillors
Hardware merchants
Immigrants to Upper Canada